Kasha is a commune of the city of Bukavu .  It is located northwest of the city center on Lake Kivu .  With the advent of the RCD, Bukavu grew from three to four communes.  The commune of Kasha is created from an urban-rural district of the commune of Bagira.

References 

Bukavu